Myomyrus is a genus of elephantfish in the family Mormyridae.

Species
There are currently 3 recognized species in this genus:

 Myomyrus macrodon Boulenger 1898 (Matadi mormyrid)
 Myomyrus macrops Boulenger 1914 (Ja River mormyrid)
 Myomyrus pharao (Poll & Taverne 1967) (Kinsuka mormyrid)

References 

Weakly electric fish
Mormyridae
Ray-finned fish genera